In Dreams is a 1999 American psychological thriller film directed by Neil Jordan. It is an adaptation of the novel Doll's Eyes (1993) by Bari Wood. The film stars Annette Bening, Robert Downey Jr., Aidan Quinn, and Stephen Rea. Its screenplay was co-written by Jordan and screenwriter Bruce Robinson. Filming took place various at locations throughout New England as well as on the Baja California Peninsula.

In Dreams was released in the United States on January 15, 1999, by DreamWorks Pictures. The film grossed $12 million at the box office, and received varied reviews from critics, with several praising its visuals and Bening's performance, while others criticizing its lack of narrative coherence.

Plot
Claire Cooper is a suburban housewife and mother in rural Massachusetts who illustrates children's stories. Her husband, Paul, is an airline pilot, and is frequently away from home due to work, leaving Claire to care for their daughter, Rebecca. Claire begins experiencing bizarre, vague dreams involving an underwater city and the murder of a young girl. Shortly after, Rebecca goes missing during an outdoor school play, and is later found dead at the bottom of a lake. Claire is devastated and takes a while to recover.

Believing her dreams are premonitory, Claire attempts to involve herself in the police investigation, but is met with resistance. Her dreams and visions increase, and she believes she is witnessing the movements of her daughter's killer, a serial killer named Vivian Thompson. She uncovers that the underwater city she has experienced in her dreams is a former town, Northfield, that was flooded when a reservoir was formed.

The visions drive Claire to the brink of insanity, and she seeks help from a psychologist, Dr. Silverman, who diagnoses her as psychotic. She is subsequently committed to a psychiatric institution after slitting her wrists, but remains plagued by visions, including one of Vivian  murdering Paul. When she experiences another vision of Vivian kidnapping another girl, Claire manages to escape from the institution, hoping to stop him from claiming another victim. She steals the vehicle of a security guard, and tracks Vivian to an abandoned fruit factory situated along the lake.

Upon arriving at the factory, she is met by Vivian and the young girl, Ruby. The childlike Vivian, who was severely abused as a boy by his mother, kidnaps little girls to be his "playmates"; when they resist, he becomes enraged and kills them. He is holding Claire hostage at the factory, and wants her and Ruby to stay with him as his "new family". Police manage to track Claire to the factory, where they have a face-off with Vivian, holding a gun to Claire's head. While a SWAT team attempts to snipe Vivian from a helicopter, he chases Claire along a bridge crossing a tributary waterfall, knocking both her and himself over the guardrail. Claire and Vivian plunge below the falls. In the water, Claire has a vision of being reunited with her daughter before drowning.

Later, Vivian, who survived the fall, is committed to the same psychiatric institute where Claire had been incarcerated. While lying in his bed, he has horrific visions of Claire's spirit haunting him and the phrase "Sweet dreams, Vivian" being scrawled in blood on the ceiling. The phrase emerges across the walls of his cell, and he screams in horror.

Cast 

 Annette Bening as Claire Cooper
 Katie Sagona as Rebecca Cooper
 Aidan Quinn as Paul Cooper
 Robert Downey Jr. as Vivian Thompson
 Paul Guilfoyle as Detective Jack Kay
 Kathleen Langlois as Snow White
 Jennifer Holly Berry as Hunter
 Amelia Claire Novotny as Prince
 Kristin Sroka as Wicked Step-Mother
 Robert Walsh as Man at School Play
 Denise Cormier as Woman at School Play
 John Fiore as Policeman
 Ken Cheeseman as Paramedic
 Dennis Boutsikaris as Doctor Stevens
 Stephen Rea as Doctor Silverman
 Margo Martindale as Nurse Floyd
 June Lewin as Kindly Nurse
 Pamela Payton-Wright as Ethel
 Geoffrey Wigdor as Vivian Thompson - As Teenager
 Krystal Benn as Ruby
 Dorothy Dwyer as Foster Mother

Analysis
Film scholar Maria Pramaggiore notes In Dreams as one example in Jordan's filmography in which popular songs are employed to "disestablish time and place to convey the notion of time as a cyclical process." Pramaggiore also stresses the importance of the uncanny in the film, citing it as one of several in Jordan's filmographyalong with The Miracle (1991) and The Butcher Boy (1997)in which "dreams assume the status of reality."

Production

Screenplay
The film is based on the novel Doll's Eyes, by Bari Wood. The project originated as a script titled Blue Vision, written by Bruce Robinson. Neil Jordan came aboard to direct the film as one of the first projects at DreamWorks, having worked with David Geffen on his previous three films. Jordan rewrote the script and re-titled it In Dreams. Commenting on what the film's overarching theme was, Jordan stated: "I don't think the world behaves in a rational manner, but we all write about it and talk about it as if it does. I think that's what a lot of stories I've told have been about. How people try and make sense of their own lives with the tools available like logic and a sense of consequence, and these forces erupt into lives that make no sense."

Filming
Filming took place in multiple locations in New England, including several Massachusetts cities: Northampton (at the Northampton State Hospital and Smith College), Southampton, Northfield, and Florence. Additional photography took place At the Wentworth by the Sea in New Castle, New Hampshire. The underwater sets were created and filmed at 20th Century Fox studios on the Baja California Peninsula, in the same water tank used for the underwater portions of James Cameron's Titanic (1997). The film's production budget was approximately $30 million.

Cinematographer Darius Khondji applied filters on the camera lenses to achieve lush accents on the film's autumnal imagery, noted by critic Nick Pinkerton as "hysterical and hyper-real."

Release

Box office
In Dreams was released in the United States on January 15, 1999, across 1,670 theaters. During its opening weekend, it grossed $3,992,449, ranking at number 11 in the U.S. box office. It remained in theaters through the weekend of March 5, 1999, with a final gross of $11,927,682.

Critical reception
The film holds a 25% rating on Rotten Tomatoes, based on 51 reviews, with an average rating of 4.8/10. The site's consensus states: "Some interesting visuals, but the movie is as confusing as a dream." Audiences polled by CinemaScore gave the film an average rating of "C-" on an A+ to F scale.

Janet Maslin of The New York Times praised the film's cinematography and Bening's performance, summarizing: "At heart In Dreams is just a campfire story, and a pretty loony one at that. But Neil Jordan has directed it furiously, with a lush, insinuating visual style that gets right under the skin." Some critics, such as Roger Ebert of the Chicago Sun-Times, commented on the film's dubious plot, deeming it "the silliest thriller in many a moon, and the only one in which the heroine is endangered by apples. She also survives three falls from very high places (two into a lake, one onto apples), escapes from a hospital and a madhouse, has the most clever dog since Lassie and causes a traffic pileup involving a truck and a dozen cars."

Jack Mathews of the Los Angeles Times likened the film to A Nightmare on Elm Street (1984), but criticized it for its lack of realism. However, Mathews praised the film's underwater visual sequences, noting that they "have the haunting atmosphere typical of Jordan's past horror films," and wrote that "Bening works this role like a sore muscle, or a tooth that needs pulling. It's a courageous, anti-glamour effort, one of those sweat-and-drool "Snake Pit" performances that drives hair and makeup crazy, not to mention mental-health-care providers." The Washington Posts Desson Howe similarly praised Bening for "an exhausting, breakout performance," as well as the film's "surrealistic" visuals. Owen Gleiberman of Entertainment Weekly awarded the film a C-minus rating, deeming it a "dismayingly schlocky and literal-minded thriller." Emanuel Levy of Variety characterized the film as "dark, scary and uncompromising," and surmised that criticisms would result from the film's "convoluted narrative with a downbeat tone and shockingly unconventional ending, which doesn’t provide the genre’s customary pay-off."

Co-writer Robinson criticized the film the year after its release, stating: "It was a complete and utter mess from top to bottom. I thought Jennifer Eight was a low point, but Christ almighty, this hit the floor and dug." In a retrospective review, critic Nick Pinkerton referred to the film as "a fundamentally miscalibrated movie of rather piquant badness, the work of a preternaturally talented hack, if such a thing can exist."

Soundtrack
The soundtrack to In Dreams was released on January 12, 1999. Songs are by Elliot Goldenthal featuring London Metropolitan Orchestra, except where noted.

References

Works cited

External links 

 
 
 

1999 films
Films set in Massachusetts
American serial killer films
Films about nightmares
Films about child death
American supernatural films
Films directed by Neil Jordan
American supernatural thriller films
1999 thriller films
DreamWorks Pictures films
Amblin Entertainment films
Films shot in California
Films shot in Massachusetts
Films shot in North Carolina
Films shot in New Hampshire
Films shot in Tennessee
Films shot in Mexico
Films based on American novels
Films based on thriller novels
Films scored by Elliot Goldenthal
1990s English-language films
1990s American films